The 2015 Four Days of Dunkirk was the 61st edition of the Four Days of Dunkirk cycling stage race. It started on 6 May in Dunkirk and ended on 10 May again in Dunkirk.

Schedule

Teams
The start list included 16 teams – 2 UCI WorldTeams, 10 Professional Continental Teams, and 4 Continental Teams.

Stages

Stage 1
6 May 2015 — Dunkirk to Orchies,

Stage 2
7 May 2015 — Fontaine-au-Pire to Maubeuge,

Stage 3
8 May 2015 — Barlin to Saint-Omer,

Stage 4
9 May 2015 — Base de loisirs EOLYS (Lestrem) to Cassel,

Stage 5
10 May 2015 — Cappelle-la-Grande to Dunkirk,

Classification leadership table

Final standings

General classification

Points classification

Mountains classification

Sprints classification

Young rider classification

Teams classification

References

External links

 

Four Days of Dunkirk
Four Days of Dunkirk
Four Days of Dunkirk